Hilokee Creek is a stream in the U.S. state of Georgia.

A variant name is "Hiloka Creek". Hilokee is a name derived from the Muskogean language.

References

Rivers of Georgia (U.S. state)
Rivers of Lee County, Georgia
Rivers of Sumter County, Georgia
Rivers of Terrell County, Georgia